Tampico Township is located in Whiteside County in the U.S. state of  Illinois. As of the 2010 census, its population was 1,148 and it contained 449 housing units.

Geography

References

External links
City-data.com
Whiteside County Official Site

Townships in Whiteside County, Illinois
Townships in Illinois